Nama stenocarpa is a species of flowering plant in the borage family known by the common name mud fiddleleaf. It is native to northern Mexico and areas of southern California, Arizona, and Texas, where it is known from wet habitat such as marshes and swampy valley wetlands.

Description
Nama stenocarpa is a hairy annual herb with a prostrate or upright branching stem up to about 40 centimeters long. The oval or spoon-shaped leaves are up to about 3 centimeters long, wavy or rolled along the edges, and clasp the stem at their bases. The inflorescence is a cluster of white flowers and their bristly, leaflike sepals. Each funnel-shaped flower is about half a centimeter long and wide with a lobed face.

External links
Jepson Manual eFlora (TJM2) treatment of Nama stenocarpum
UC Photos gallery — Nama stenocarpum

stenocarpa
Flora of Arizona
Flora of California
Flora of Texas
Natural history of the California chaparral and woodlands
Natural history of the Peninsular Ranges
Flora without expected TNC conservation status